Martha Hunt (born April 27, 1989) is an American model. She is best known for her work as a Victoria's Secret Angel. She is also a spokesmodel for Free People.

Early life
Hunt was discovered by a photographer in Charlotte, North Carolina, who introduced her to agencies in New York. She moved there and signed with IMG Models.

Her first runway work was in 2007, at Paris Fashion Week, where she walked for Issey Miyake. In 2009, she was on the cover of Vogue China and Harper's Bazaar, GQ, Revue des Modes, V, Glamour Germany, and Muse. She has walked for Tracy Reese, J. Mendel, Wayne, and Rebecca Taylor.

Career
She has walked more than 180 fashion shows, including Acne, Balmain, Carolina Herrera, Castelbajac, Chanel, Christopher Kane, Diane Von Furstenberg, Dolce & Gabbana, Fátima Lopes, Giorgio Armani, Givenchy, Hervé Léger, Issey Miyake, Jason Wu, Jefen, Louis Vuitton, Marchesa, Miu Miu, Oscar de la Renta, Prada, rag & bone, Ralph Lauren, Stella McCartney, Tory Burch, Ramy Brook, and Versace. In 2010 and 2011, she was featured in Velour, Marie Claire Italia, Vogue Russia, Harper's Bazaar, and Allure, as well as advertisements for BCBG Max Azria, Y-3, Hugo Boss, and Via Spiga.

She signed with IMG Models in 2012, during which she also posed for Pennyblack, Jason Wu, and Victoria's Secret, was featured on the cover of Elle, and was selected for LOVE magazine's 2012 video advent calendar.

In 2013, she was featured in commercials for Miu Miu, Santa Lolla, Max&Co (with Frida Gustavsson), Express, Ralph Lauren, Prada, rag & bone, and Juicy Couture. She also posed for many magazines including Wonderland, V, Harper's Bazaar, Vogue, 25, Numéro, and Elle Australia. Since 2013 she has represented the brand Free People, which has featured her in several commercials and photoshoots.

In 2014, she posed for Rebecca Minkoff and for the magazines Marie Claire Italy, Glamour Germany, Stonefox, and Lui. She walked for Tome, Jason Wu, Cushnie et Ochs, Hervé Léger, Carolina Herrera, Polo Ralph Lauren, and Jeremy Scott. She did an entry about the Coachella Music Festival in Vanity Fair UK. She was featured in Victoria's Secret's catalogue in early 2013 and walked her first Victoria's Secret Fashion Show in 2013. In 2014, she was credited. In 2015, she was part of the first Victoria's Secret Swim Special and became an Angel.

Personal life
Hunt has a diagnosis of scoliosis. Speaking of her surgical scars, Hunt had stated "Scars are uniquely beautiful, and they tell a triumphant story about you. I have a long one down my back, and one on my lower right abdomen." In January 2020, she announced her engagement to photographer Jason McDonald. On June 18, 2021, Hunt and MacDonald announced that they expecting a child. Their daughter was born on November 6, 2021.

Hunt has the distinction of scoring the highest-ever point total by a player in the Fast Money round of Celebrity Family Feud, scorings 197 points during her 2019 appearance on the show. Every one of her responses was the No. 1 answer. Hunt was part of a team made up of Victoria’s Secret Angels that defeated a team of five men from Bachelor Nation. Fellow Angel Jasmine Tookes supplied the remaining points for the team to win the $25,000 prize.

Filmography

Films

Television

Music videos

References

External links

 

1989 births
Living people
Female models from North Carolina
People from Wilson, North Carolina
IMG Models models
Victoria's Secret Angels
21st-century American women